Monaco competed at the 1948 Summer Olympics in London, England. Four competitors, all men, took part in two events in one sports.

Shooting

Four shooters represented Monaco in 1948.

50 metre pistol
 Herman Schultz

50 metre rifle
 Michel Ravarino
 Pierre Marsan
 Roger Abel

References

External links
Official Olympic Reports

Nations at the 1948 Summer Olympics
1948 Summer Olympics
Summer Olympics